Amir Qaroqulov was a presidential candidate in the 2006 Tajik presidential election, representing the Agrarian Party.

References

Living people
Agrarian Party (Tajikistan) politicians
Year of birth missing (living people)
Place of birth missing (living people)